Necramium is a monotypic genus of flowering plants belonging to the family Melastomataceae. The only species is Necramium gigantophyllum.

Its native range is Trinidad to Venezuela.

References

Melastomataceae
Melastomataceae genera
Monotypic Myrtales genera